State Highway 105 (SH 105)  is a state highway in the U.S. state of Texas that runs from Brenham to the outskirts of Beaumont.  The route was originally proposed in 1925 and took its current routing in 1984.

Route description
SH 105 begins as a pair of one-way roads at an intersection with Business U.S. Route 290 in downtown Brenham.  It then progresses northeast out of Brenham through mainly farming lands.  It passes near Washington-on-the-Brazos, Texas, which is the birthplace of Texas as the location of the signing of the Texas Declaration of Independence.  It then crosses the Brazos River before passing through Navasota.  The route briefly joins SH 6 before proceeding east again.  It passes near Lake Conroe before entering the city of Conroe and an intersection with Interstate 45.  The route continues east, passing through the very southern edge of Sam Houston National Forest before reaching Cleveland and an intersection with Future Interstate 69/U.S. Route 59.  The route continues east out of Cleveland, briefly coinciding with SH 321, passing through a large section of East Texas Piney Woods, before reaching its eastern terminus at U.S. Routes 69, 96, and 287 on the far northern edge of Beaumont.

Route history
The highway was originally proposed on June 8, 1925 from Brenham east through Navasota and Conroe to Cleveland, roughly paralleling a local railroad line. By 1926, the section from Brenham to Navasota was transferred to SH 90. On April 6, 1932, a proposed extension east to Moss Hill was designated. On July 12, 1933, a new section of SH 105 was under construction, being built westward from Beaumont to Moss Hill, replacing SH 133. On March 19, 1935, it was shifted north through Rye. On July 15, 1935, all of SH 105 east of Cleveland was cancelled. On February 11, 1937, the section from Moss Hill to Beaumont was restored (but not Cleveland to Rye, so a gap was created). On February 25, 1937, SH 105 Loop was designated through Conroe. On June 21, 1938, the Cleveland-Neville's Ferry Road from Cleveland to Rye had its routing approved, and construction started on it. On March 18, 1947, SH 105 was routed on the Cleveland-Neville's Ferry Road, closing the gap. Construction was sporadic, with the section between Conroe and Beaumont not completed until the 1960s. On March 26, 1962, the section of SH 105 from Moss Hill and on a line equidistant between Batson and Saratoga to FM 770 was cancelled, creating a gap. On February 28, 1973, the section of SH 90 from Navasota to Brenham was transferred back to SH 105 and the section of SH 105 from SH 6 west to Loop 508 (now Business SH 6) was transferred to Spur 515. The current route was set on December 21, 1984 with the highway replacing FM 162 and shortening the route from Cleveland to Beaumont. The old route became part of FM 787. One portion of FM 162 was originally designated as FM 1935. On August 25, 2005, a new routing around Cleveland was approved for construction, while the section through Cleveland was designated as a business route of 105: 105-T. Construction has been completed.

Business routes

SH 105 has one business route.

Business State Highway 105-T is a Business Loop that runs on the former routing of SH 105 through Cleveland in southeast Texas.  The road was designated in 2005, in preparation of the bypass routing of the main highway south of Cleveland.

Major intersections

References

Conroe, Texas
105
Transportation in Jefferson County, Texas
Transportation in Hardin County, Texas
Transportation in Liberty County, Texas
Transportation in Montgomery County, Texas
Transportation in Grimes County, Texas
Transportation in Brazos County, Texas
Transportation in Washington County, Texas
Two-lane freeways in the United States